This is a list of NCAA baseball coaches with 1,100 career wins through the completion of the 2022 season.

Key

Coaches with 1,100 career wins

References

Baseball
Lists of baseball managers